Tara is a rural locality (a selo) in Tukansky Selsoviet, Beloretsky District, Bashkortostan, Russia. The population was 59 as of 2010. There are 6 streets.

Geography 
Tara is located 95 km southwest of Beloretsk (the district's administrative centre) by road. Zapadnaya Maygashlya is the nearest rural locality.

References 

Rural localities in Beloretsky District